Chapacho is a town in Madhyapur Thimi of Bhaktapur District in the Bagmati Zone of central Nepal. At the time of the 1991 Nepal census it had a population of 7,734 with 1,186 houses in it.

References

Populated places in Bhaktapur District